Rabindra Kumar Jena is an Indian politician. He was working as Managing Director, Balasore Alloys Ltd. He was elected to the 16th Lok Sabha in 2014 from Balasore constituency in Odisha.
He is a member of the Biju Janata Dal (BJD) political party. In May 2019 Parliamentary Elections, he was defeated by Pratap Sarangi of BJP by a small margin His activity in the parliament in terms of attendance, debate participation and number of questions asked and bills raised is among the highest

Positions held

Awards and recognition
Awards which include : Rajiv Gandhi Sadbhavana Award - by Rajiv Gandhi Forum, Odisha; Utkal Samman - 2004; Arch of Excellence (Business) Award - 2004; Gem of India Award - 2004; Maharaja Sri Ramchandra Bhanjdeo Award; Industrial Promotion in the State Award - 2005 by Governor of Odisha; Rajiv Gandhi Rastriya Ekta Samman - 2005, New Delhi; State Level Excellence Award - 2005 By Honble Chief Minister of Odisha; Bhartiya Vikas Ratan Award - 2007; Bharat Gourav Award by Institute of Economic Studies - 2008; Award of Excellence by Honble Governor of Odisha for Highest Relief Distribution during flood in Balasore District - 2008; Pride of the Nation Award - 2008; Think Odisha Leadership Award - 2010 for Best Education Supporty by Honble Governor of Odisha

See also
 Indian general election, 2014 (Odisha)

References

Living people
Lok Sabha members from Odisha
India MPs 2014–2019
People from Balasore district
Year of birth missing (living people)
Biju Janata Dal politicians